Fedomia is a genus of organisms resembling sea sponges from the Ediacaran Period.

The organisms look like sacs, often connected and occasionally radiating from a central point, and are millimetres to centimetres in length.  Their surface is often patterned with a number of concave, star-shaped, spicule-like structures with six to eight points, with a diameter of 2–5 mm; these were probably flexible rather than rigid.

See also
List of Ediacaran genera

References

Precambrian sponges